Jesse David Armstrong (born 13 December 1970) is a British author, screenwriter, and producer. He is a co-creator of the Channel 4 comedy series Peep Show (2003–2015) and Fresh Meat (2011–2016), and the creator of the HBO satirical comedy-drama series Succession (2018–present).

Armstrong has received many nominations and awards, including a nomination for the Academy Award for Best Adapted Screenplay for co-writing the film In the Loop (2009), and three wins for the Primetime Emmy Award for Outstanding Writing for a Drama Series for writing the season finales of the first, second and third seasons of Succession.

Early and personal life
Armstrong was born in Oswestry in Shropshire, England. His father was a further education teacher who became a crime novelist in the 1990s, while his mother worked in nursery schools. He attended a comprehensive school in Oswestry before studying American Studies at the University of Manchester, spending a year abroad in Massachusetts. After graduation he moved to London and worked as a washer-upper at Oddbins. In 1995, he began to work as a researcher for the Labour MP Doug Henderson, initially without payment. At the same time, he acted as a consultant on politics for Rory Bremner's production company. He subsequently worked as a painter and decorator.

Armstrong is married and has two children. His wife works for the National Health Service.

Career

Collaborations with Sam Bain
Armstrong met his writing partner Sam Bain while at the University of Manchester, living with him in his final year. They began writing together after they graduated, when they had both moved to London.

At the beginning of their writing career, Armstrong and Bain wrote for the Channel 4 sketch show Smack the Pony and the children's shows The Queen's Nose and My Parents Are Aliens. They went on to create and write Peep Show, BBC One sitcom The Old Guys, and most recently Channel 4 comedy dramas Fresh Meat and Babylon. They also wrote for the BBC Radio 4 sketch show That Mitchell and Webb Sound, starring Peep Shows two main actors David Mitchell and Robert Webb, and its BBC Two adaptation That Mitchell and Webb Look. Peep Show has won several writing awards, including a BAFTA for Best Situation Comedy in 2008.

To date, Armstrong and Bain have written two films together – the 2007 comedy Magicians, and, alongside Chris Morris, the 2010 terrorism satire Four Lions.

Armstrong and Bain received the Writers' Guild of Great Britain Award at the British Comedy Awards 2010. In 2012 both Armstrong and Bain were featured on the TV industry journal Broadcast'''s 'Hot 100' list, highlighting the most successful people in UK television.

In 2012, Armstrong and Bain wrote the Channel 4 comedy pilot Bad Sugar, a spoof of Dynasty-style soap operas, which stars Olivia Colman, Julia Davis and Sharon Horgan, all of whom also co-conceived the show.

In 2014 Armstrong, with Danny Boyle, Robert Jones and Sam Bain, co-created the Channel 4 comedy drama Babylon.  Armstrong wrote the first and last of the six initial episodes and co-wrote the pilot with Sam Bain.

Other writing
Alongside Armando Iannucci, Simon Blackwell and Tony Roche, Armstrong wrote for the first three series of the BAFTA-winning BBC Four comedy The Thick of It, and its 2009 film spin-off In the Loop. In The Loop was nominated for the Academy Award for Best Adapted Screenplay in 2009, and won Best British Screenplay at the 2009 Evening Standard British Film Awards. Alongside The Thick of Its writing team, Armstrong wrote one episode of the first season of HBO comedy series Veep, set in the office of the American vice-president.

In the run-up to the 2010 UK general election, Armstrong wrote a column in The Guardian – 'Malcolm Tucker's election briefing – as dictated to Jesse Armstrong'. He previously wrote a similar column for New Statesman, entitled 'Tactical Briefing'.

In 2010, Armstrong's currently-unproduced screenplay Murdoch, a drama in which Rupert Murdoch and his family disagree over who should have control of his company, received attention after it appeared on The Black List, a list of unproduced screenplays most liked by Hollywood industry figures. In the wake of the 2011 phone hacking scandal involving newspapers owned by Murdoch it was rumoured that the script was being developed by Channel 4, but Armstrong dismissed these claims.

Armstrong is reportedly developing a biopic of the Republican Party strategist Lee Atwater, with Chris Henchy and Adam McKay.

In October 2011 it was reported that Armstrong's film adaptation of Richard DiLello's book The Longest Cocktail Party, charting the founding of The Beatles' record company Apple Records and the recording of their final album Let It Be, was to be directed by Michael Winterbottom. In February 2016 it was reported that Winterbottom had withdrawn from the project and the film's future was uncertain.

Armstrong wrote one episode of Charlie Brooker's anthology series Black Mirror, entitled "The Entire History of You". Robert Downey Jr. has since bought the rights to adapt the script for a forthcoming film.

Armstrong's first novel, Love, Sex and Other Foreign Policy Goals, was released in April 2015.

In 2017, Armstrong's American drama series Succession'' executive produced by Adam McKay and Will Ferrell was picked up to series by HBO.

Filmography and bibliography

Film

Television

Books
Fiction

References

External links
 
 
 Ideas Factory interview with Sam Bain and Jesse Armstrong
 The BAFTA Comedy Debate – Jesse Armstrong debates the state of Television Comedy
 Various Artists Limited Joint Creative Director

Living people
1970 births
Alumni of the University of Manchester
English comedy writers
English television writers
People from Oswestry
English male writers
British male television writers
Primetime Emmy Award winners